This Viking Age runestone, designated as G 181 in the Rundata catalog, was originally located at a church at Sanda, Gotland, Sweden, and is believed to depict the three Norse pagan gods Odin, Thor, and Freyr.

Description

The runestone was discovered in the churchyard of Sanda church in 1863 and is currently located in the Swedish Museum of National Antiquities. It is classified as being carved in runestone style Pr2, also known as Ringerike style.

The inscription depicts two scenes under an arching runic text band. The lower panel contains three figures, holding a spear, a hammer or club, and a sickle. Because the weapon of Odin was the spear Gungnir, that of Thor the hammer Mjöllnir, and Freyr is identified with farming, the figures have been identified as these three gods. They are depicted wearing typical Viking Age clothing, including a cloak known as a hekla and a tasseled conical cap called a skott-húfa. The upper scene also has three figures, which are considered to be the same gods; a large bird that may be a crane or goose is shown bending its head over the figure identified as Freyr. Its meaning is not understood.

Some authorities have cited the runestone as evidence that Odin, Thor, and Freyr formed a divine Norse triad or trinity. The proposition of this divine triad comes from theories of comparative religion and descriptions and depictions of these gods. Other evidence for such a triad includes Adam of Bremen's description of the Temple at Uppsala as containing statues of these gods. These three are also the only Norse gods known to have been actively worshipped during the Viking Age.

The runic inscription is carved in the younger futhark and consists of three personal names. Björn (Old Norse Bjǫrn) was a common name meaning "bear"; Gunnbjǫrn translates as "Battle Bear" and Farbjǫrn may mean "Far Traveling Bear".

Inscription

Runic

Transliteration of the runes into Latin characters
: roþuisl : aug : farborn : auk : kunborn :

Transcription into Old Norse
Hróðvísl ok Farbjǫrn ok Gunnbjǫrn.

Translation in English
Hróðvisl and Farbjọrn and Gunnbjọrn.

References

See also
Triple deity

Rune- and picture stones on Gotland